Chaita is a village and a gram panchayat in Basirhat II CD Block in Basirhat subdivision of North 24 Parganas district, West Bengal, India with total 528 families residing. The Chaita village has population of 2390 of which 1215 are males while 1175 are females as per population census 2011.

The Chaita gram panchayat has six villages, named Ghona, Jagatpur, Kendua, Chaita, Malatipur and Kripalpur.

In Chaita village population of children with age 0-6 is 331 which makes up 13.85% of total population of village. Average Sex Ratio of Chaita village is 967 which is higher than West Bengal state average of 950. Child Sex Ratio for the Chaita as per census is 1006, higher than West Bengal average of 956.

Chaita village has lower literacy rate compared to West Bengal. In 2011, literacy rate of Chaita village was 57.94% compared to 76.26% of West Bengal. In Chaita Male literacy stands at 59.14% while female literacy rate was 56.69%.

As per constitution of India and Panchyati Raaj Act, Chaita village is administrated by Sarpanch (Head of Village) who is elected representative of village.

Sarpanch of Chaita Gram Panchayat

Electoral divisions
Gram Panchayat seats at Chaita Gram Panchayat

Panchayat Samiti seats at Chaita Gram Panchayat

Zilla Parishad seats at Chaita Gram Panchayat

Education
Colleges nearest to Chaita
 Chandraketugarh Sahidullah Smriti Mahavidyalaya
 Taki Government College
 Basirhat College

High schools nearest to Chaita
 Kaderia High Madrasa
 Malatipur High School
 Gopalpur Popular Academy
 Gopalpur Girl's High School

Transport
Malatipur is the nearest railway station of Chaita. Haroa - Gopalpur More road (STATE HIGHWAY NO 03) passed through edge of this village.

Villages in North 24 Parganas district